Galberos ( Garuberosu), also known as Gelberos is a fictional kaiju featured in the tokusatsu TV series, Ultraman Nexus. Galberos appeared in episodes 6, 17, 18, and 35.

Subtitle: .

Ultraman Nexus

Stats 
His height is around 52 Meters tall. He weighs around 39,000 Tons.

History 
Chronologically, Galberos is the first Space Beast to appear on Earth. Shortly after Jun fuses with Ultraman Nexus for the first time, Galberos appears rampaging in a field. Ultraman Nexus appears shortly after, turning into his Junis Red mode and creating a meta field around them. Luckily for Nexus, Galberos is no match for Nexus's speed and is soon destroyed by Nexus's Core Impulse attack. 

Some time later after Nosferu is destroyed, Dark Mephisto revives Galberos shortly afterwards to attack the Night Raiders while Jun confronts Mizorogi (Dark Mephisto's human form.) With no other choice, Jun transforms into Ultraman Nexus to face Galberos inside another meta field while Mizorogi escaped. Once again the battle was in Nexus's favor as now the Night Raiders are fighting Galberos too. However, the odds change after Galberos uses hypnosis to make the Night Raiders attack Nexus instead. With that opportunity, Galberos bites into Nexus's left arm, creating an internal wound to which is to be exploited again in the future for Nexus. Luckily, The Night Raiders eventually shake off the hypnosis and attack the space beast along with Nexus. But before they can finish off Galberos, Dark Mephisto arrives and teleports Galberos and himself away to safety. Dark Mephisto (as Mizorogi) later summons Galberos after creating a dark field to his advantage in fighting the Night Raiders. Jun turns into Ultraman Nexus again, but is still in pain from the wound Galberos left on his arm. Mizorogi protects Galberos with a force field from Night Raiders until one of the members, Nagi shoots him in the back. Without Mizorogi/Dark Mephisto's protection, the dark field disappears and Galberos is soon destroyed by Ultraman Nexus's Over-Ray Storm. 

Many months later Galberos is revived once again, this time by The Unknown Hand to assist another Space Beast, Mega Flash. With Nexus fighting two space beasts, the hero is soon overpowered by his adversaries. Ultraman Nexus however does not give up and after using the Ultimate Vanisher to destroy Mega Flash, Galberos is slain shortly afterwards by the Sword Storm.

Ultra Galaxy Mega Monster Battle: Never Ending Odyssey 
This Monster reappears in the series Ultra Galaxy Mega Monster Battle: Never Ending Odyssey.

In this series, Galberos belongs to an Alien Nackle. He is first used (unseen) killing  Earthtron that belongs to an Alien Zelan. Later on, Nackle summons him again to create hypnotic illusions of the monster Zetton to fight Rei and his Gomora. Whenever it seems that Zetton is destroyed, he "returns" to fight and tire out both Rei and Gomora into becoming weak. Once the duo is weakened enough, Galberos reveals himself and attacks the exhausted Gomora. Suddenly pushed to their limits, Reimon becomes overcome with Reiblood energy and rage, transforming him into Burst Mode Reimon, Gomora too gains the form Reionic Burst Gomora. Now with uncontrolled power, Gomora vaporizes Galberos instantly and his master is short to follow.

Mega Monster Battle: Ultra Galaxy 
This Monster reappears in the movie Mega Monster Battle: Ultra Galaxy.

Galberos is one of Ultraman Belial's 100 Monster Army. Right after Red King is destroyed, Zero hits him and is killed

References

Fictional extraterrestrial life forms